The George Tooke Shield is a rugby league competition in southern New South Wales and the Australian Capital Territory. Founded in 1927, the competition is a part of the broader Canberra Rugby League Division of the New South Wales Rugby League.

Senior Grade Clubs 
With the advent of the ACTRL in 1982, the George Tooke Shield effectively became the continuation of the Group 8 competition.

Note: Other Clubs from the Canberra Rugby League enter teams in Second Division Lower Grades

Former Clubs

George Tooke Shield Grand Finals

Team performance

Second Division Under 18/19s Grand Finals

Team performance

Second Division (George Tooke Shield) Ladies League Tag

Team performance

Second Division Women's Tackle

Team Performance

References 

Rugby league in Australia